Deshamanya Noel Wimalasena (23 March 1914 – 5 May 1994) was a Sri Lankan lawyer, politician and the first Governor of Sabaragamuwa.

Early life and education
Nanediri Wimalasena was born on 23 March 1914 in Kandy, Sri Lanka. He attended Ananda College, Colombo, the Ceylon University College and the Ceylon Law College.

Political career
In 1946 Wimalasena was elected to the Kandy Municipal Council, serving as Deputy Mayor in 1946 and as Mayor in 1963.

In March 1960 he ran as the UNP candidate for parliament in the Senkadagala Electoral District. He was successful, securing over 48% of the vote. However, as neither of the major political parties managed to obtain a sufficient majority in the election a new election was called. At the July 1960 election Wimalasena lost by a narrow margin of 25 votes to the SLFP candidate, Shelton Ranaraja.

Wimalasena contested the 1965 parliamentary elections and was successful in gaining the seat of Senkadagala, defeating the sitting member, Ranaraja. Wimalasena served as the Parliamentary Secretary to the Minister of Finance between 1965 and 1970 in the Third Dudley Senanayake cabinet and between 1966 and 1970 was the Governor of the Asian Development Bank (Sri Lanka). He retained the seat in the subsequent 1970 election with over 50% of the vote however chose not to run in the 1977 election.

In December 1977 he was appointed as the Sri Lankan High Commissioner to the United Kingdom serving until January 1981. Upon his return to Sri Lanka he was the Deputy Director-General for the Greater Colombo Economics Commission.

On 30 April 1988 he was appointed as the first Governor of Sabaragamuwa remaining in the position until 1993, when he was succeeded by C. N. Saliya Mathew,

In 1993 he was awarded the national honour of Deshamanya.

See also 
List of Sri Lankan non-career diplomats

References

1914 births
1994 deaths
Alumni of Ananda College
Alumni of Ceylon Law College
Alumni of the Ceylon University College
Deshabandu
Deshamanya
Governors of Sabaragamuwa Province
High Commissioners of Sri Lanka to the United Kingdom
Mayors of Kandy
Members of the 4th Parliament of Ceylon
Members of the 6th Parliament of Ceylon
Members of the 7th Parliament of Ceylon
Parliamentary secretaries of Ceylon
People from Kandy
Sinhalese lawyers
Sinhalese politicians
United National Party politicians